The 2022 Henry 180 was the sixteenth stock car race of the 2022 NASCAR Xfinity Series, and the 13th iteration of the event. The race was held on Saturday, July 2, 2022, in Elkhart Lake, Wisconsin at Road America, a  permanent road course. The race was increased from 45 laps to 48 laps, due to a NASCAR overtime finish. Ty Gibbs, driving for Joe Gibbs Racing, made a last lap pass on Kyle Larson, and earned his 8th career NASCAR Xfinity Series win, along with his fourth of the season. To fill out the podium, Josh Berry, driving for JR Motorsports, would finish in 3rd, respectively.

The race was marred by a crash on lap 25. With 20 laps to go in the race, tempers began to flare between Noah Gragson and Sage Karam, after having a full-contact battle for the 10th place position. Gragson showed his displeasure by giving Karam the middle finger after exiting turn 1. After the contact continued, Gragson became frustrated, and made a right turn into the side of Karam, spinning them both in front of the pack. After dust was kicked up from the spin, the field behind them was blind, causing confusion for the drivers. 16 cars would be collected in the wreck, with some drivers having brutal hits. The worst hit was Brandon Brown, after slamming into the side of Tyler Reddick at a high force. Brown got out of his car under his own power, but immediately went over to the right side of the wall and sat down in pain. Three days after the race, Gragson was fined 35,000 and docked 30 driver and owner points.

This was the debut race for the 2021 ARCA Menards Series East champion, Sammy Smith.

Background 
Road America is a motorsport road course located near Elkhart Lake, Wisconsin, United States on Wisconsin Highway 67. It has hosted races since the 1950s and currently hosts races in the NASCAR Cup and Xfinity Series, WeatherTech SportsCar Championship, IndyCar Series, SCCA Pirelli World Challenge, ASRA, AMA Superbike series, and SCCA Pro Racing's Trans-Am Series.

Entry list 

 (R) denotes rookie driver.
 (i) denotes driver who are ineligible for series driver points.

Practice 
The only 30-minute practice session was held on Friday, July 1, at 4:30 PM CST.

Qualifying 
Qualifying was held on Friday, July 1, at 5:00 PM CST. Since Road America is a road course, the qualifying system is a two group system, with two rounds. Drivers will be separated into two groups, Group A and Group B. Each driver will have a lap to set a time. The fastest 5 drivers from each group will advance to the final round. Drivers will also have one lap to set a time. The fastest driver to set a time in the round will win the pole.

Race results 
Stage 1 Laps: 10

Stage 2 Laps: 10

Stage 3 Laps: 25

Penalties
Noah Gragson was fined 35,000 dollars and was docked 30 driver points while his team JR Motorsports was docked the same amount in owner points for an incident involving Sage Karam during lap 25, which resulted in an 14-car wreck.

Standings after the race 

Drivers' Championship standings

Note: Only the first 12 positions are included for the driver standings.

References 

2022 NASCAR Xfinity Series
NASCAR races at Road America
Henry 180
2022 in sports in Wisconsin